is an English land law case, at the court of final appeal level, concerning the succession to the burden of positive covenants in freehold land within which it is of relatively broad application. It is distinguished in cases of regular payments related to easements in English law which are enjoyed (see Halsall v Brizell) and some other narrow categories, many of which are similarly well-known and well-cited notable cases.

Facts
Walford House was primarily a house but partly the building was a small cottage. When the small cottage was sold, as a sale of part, and as freehold land, the owner of the main house (vendor) covenanted to keep the whole roof in repair. The roof fell into disrepair and the cottage owner wished to sue the vendor's successor in title to carry out the works (specific performance) and/or for damages.

Judgment
Lord Templeman held that the covenant could not be enforced because the covenant was positive. His judgment said the following.

He also rejected that the benefit and burden principle could be taken to its logical conclusion to enforce the carrying out of independent positive obligations.

Other legal arrangements
The judgement has no impact on the law of leases (which in the case of land automatically create leasehold estates) nor on the law of rentcharges agreed by deed and registered against freehold land. Either of these can be used to provide means to enforce a broad range of positive covenants.

See also

English land law
English trusts law
English property law

Notes

References

Covenant (law)
English land case law
House of Lords cases
1994 in British law
1994 in case law